Ahmad Tourson or Ahmad Abdulahad, is a Uyghur refugee unlawfully detained for more than seven years in the United States Guantanamo Bay detainment camps. The detention occurred despite becoming clear early on that he was innocent. The Department of Defense reports that Tourson was born on January 26, 1971, in Xinjiang Province, China, and assigned him the Internment Serial Number 201. Tourson is one of approximately two dozen detainees from the Uighur ethnic group.

He won his habeas corpus in 2008. Judge Ricardo Urbina declared his detention as unlawful and ordered that he be set free in the United States. He was sent to Palau in October 2009.

Combatant Status Review

Tourson was among the 60% of prisoners who participated in the tribunal hearings. A Summary of Evidence memo was prepared for the tribunal of each detainee. The memo for his hearing lists the following allegations:

Ahmad Tourson v. George W. Bush
A writ of habeas corpus, Ahmad Tourson v. George W. Bush, was submitted on Ahmad Tourson's behalf.
In response, on 4 January 2007,
the Department of Defense released 29 
pages of unclassified documents related to his Combatant Status Review Tribunal.

His enemy combatant status was confirmed, by Tribunal panel 7 on November 5, 2004.
His Tribunal recorded:

Administrative Review Board hearing

Detainees who were determined to have been properly classified as "enemy combatants" were scheduled to have their dossier reviewed at annual Administrative Review Board hearings. The Administrative Review Boards weren't authorized to review whether a detainee qualified for POW status, and they weren't authorized to review whether a detainee should have been classified as an "enemy combatant".

They were authorized to consider whether a detainee should continue to be detained by the United States, because they continued to pose a threat—or whether they could safely be repatriated to the custody of their home country, or whether they could be set free.

Summary of Evidence memo
A Summary of Evidence memo was prepared for Ahmad Tourson's Administrative Review Board, on August 11, 2005.
The memo listed factors for and against his continued detention.

The following primary factors favor continued detention

The following primary factors favor release or transfer

Status from 2005-2008
Five Uyghurs, whose CSR Tribunals determined they had not been enemy combatants, were transferred to detention in an Albanian refugee camp in 2006.  A man who was born to Uyghur parents, in Saudi Arabia, and thus was considered a Uyghur, was nevertheless returned to Saudi Arabia.  All the other Uyghurs remain in Guantanamo.

In September 2007, the Department of Defense released all the Summary of Evidence memos prepared for the Administrative Review Boards convened in 2006.  
While a Board reviewed his status in 2005 no Board reviewed his status in 2006.

In September 2007, the Department of Defense released the recommendation memos from 133 of the Administrative Review Boards that convened in 2005 and the recommendation memos from 55 of the Administrative Review Boards that convened in 2006.  
No recommendation memos were released for Ahmad Tourson.

On June 12, 2008, the United States Supreme Court restored the Guantanamo captives' access to the USA's civilian justice system in its ruling on Boumediene v. Bush.
Specifically it re-initiated the captives' habeas corpus petitions.
In an unrelated development Huzaifa Parhat's DTA appeal concluded that his Combatant Status Review Tribunal had erred in confirming he was an "enemy combatant", due to insufficient evidence.
The Department of Justice had the option of appealing the ruling, claiming it had new evidence.  The Uyghurs' habeas petitions were the first to be scheduled for review.  
In September 2008, days before the Department of Justice would have been expected to offer a justification in court for the Uyghurs' detention, and after six and half years of extrajudicial detention, the Department of Justice acknowledged the evidence to justify their detention did not exist.

Temporary Asylum in Palau
In June 2009, the government of Palau announced that they would offer temporary asylum to some of the Uyghurs.
The government of Palau sent a delegation to Guantanamo, and interviewed some of the remaining Uyghurs.  
Some of the Uyghurs declined to be interviewed by the Palauns.  In the end the government of Palau offered asylum to twelve of the remaining thirteen Uyghurs. Palau declined to offer asylum to one of the Uyghurs who suffered from a mental disorder, brought on by detention, that was too profound to be treated in Palau.

On October 31, 2009, Ahmad Tourson, Abdul Ghappar Abdul Rahman, Edham Mamet, Anwar Hassan, Dawut Abdurehim, and Adel Noori were released and transferred to Palau.

On June 29, 2015, Nathan Vanderklippe, reporting in The Globe and Mail, wrote that all the Uyghurs had quietly left Palau.
The Globe confirmed that Palau's agreement to give refuge to the Uyghurs was reached after the USA agreed to various secret payments.  Those payments included $93,333 to cover each Uyghur's living expenses.  The Globe confirmed that controversy still surrounded former President Johnson Toribiong who had used some of those funds to billet the Uyghurs in houses belonging to his relatives.

Vanderklippe reported that the men had never felt they could fit in with the Palauans.  
Some of the men compared Palau with a lusher, larger Guantanamo.  Some of the men were able to bring their wives to Palau.  Attempts to hold most regular jobs failed, due to cultural differences.  Attempts to use their traditional leather-working skills to be self-employed failed.  Eventually, all six men were employed as night-time security guards, a job that did not require interaction with Palauans.

Tragically, one of the men's young toddler, conceived and born on Palau, died after he fell off a balcony.  
According to Vanderklippe, the men's departure from Palau was quietly arranged with the cooperation of American officials.  He reported they left, one or two at a time, on commercial flights.  Palauan officials would not share the Uyghurs' destinations.

References

External links

From Guantánamo to the United States: The Story of the Wrongly Imprisoned Uighurs Andy Worthington October 9, 2008
Judge Ricardo Urbina’s unclassified opinion (redacted version)
MOTIONS/STATUS HEARING - UIGHURS CASES BEFORE THE HONORABLE RICARDO M. URBINA
 Relief funds help Guantanamo Uighur move forward Amnesty International USA
 Ahmad Abdulahad The Center for Constitutional Rights
 IN PARADISE Turkistan Australian Association
 Palau urges Australia to allow permanent resettlement for six Uighurs Radio Australia June 3, 2010
 Palau Uyghurs try to build new lives Kyodo News December 15, 2009
Human Rights First; Habeas Works: Federal Courts’ Proven Capacity to Handle Guantánamo Cases (2010)

Chinese extrajudicial prisoners of the United States
Living people
1971 births
Uyghurs
Guantanamo detainees known to have been released
Chinese refugees